WFTS-TV (channel 28), branded as ABC Action News, is a television station licensed to Tampa, Florida, United States, serving the Tampa Bay area as an affiliate of ABC. It is owned by the E.W. Scripps Company alongside Bradenton-licensed Ion Television station WXPX-TV (channel 66). WFTS-TV's studios are located on North Himes Avenue on Tampa's northwest side, and its transmitter is located in Riverview, Florida.

Channel 28 was launched as the Tampa Bay area's second independent television station in late 1981. Purchased by Capital Cities Communications in 1984, it was sold to Scripps the following year after the former's purchase of ABC. It became an affiliate of Fox in 1988 and joined ABC in 1994 as part of a multi-market affiliation switch, launching local newscasts at the same time.

History
A channel 28 construction permit was first issued to Lucille Frostman, involved in the construction of WSMS-TV in Fort Lauderdale, in 1966, for a station which would have been called WTSS-TV, which was never built and deleted in 1971.

Applications for a new channel 28 station in Tampa were received again in 1977, with the Christian Television Network the first to bid, followed by a group proposing a Spanish-language station; Family Television Corporation of Tampa, also of a Christian orientation; and Suncoast Telechoice, associated with subscription television equipment manufacturer Blonder Tongue Labs.

Christian Television dropped out, amended its application to specify channel 22 at Clearwater, and won a construction permit for WCLF in February 1979. The other two parties dropped out in settlement agreements in early 1981, and Family received a construction permit in March. Family stockholders included T. Terrell Sessums, former speaker of the Florida House of Representatives, and former state senate president Louis A. de la Parte Jr.

As an independent station
WFTS first signed on the air on December 14, 1981, operating as a family-oriented independent station with cartoons, off-network dramas, classic movies and religious programs. Its call letters originally stood for "Family Television Station".

In 1984, after having launched the station for just $6 million and turning a profit in the first year, Family sold the station to Capital Cities Communications for more than $30 million. The deal gave Capital Cities its first station in Florida and its first (and only) independent, as well as bringing the group to its then-maximum of seven stations. Under Capital Cities, the station added more off-network sitcoms and reduced the number of religious programs and drama series on its schedule, improving ratings against established Tampa Bay independent WTOG.

In March 1985, Capital Cities stunned the broadcasting industry with its announced purchase of ABC—a network that was ten times bigger than Capital Cities was at the time. In addition to WFTS-TV, Capital Cities owned four ABC and two CBS affiliates (which would change to ABC after the merger). The combination of Cap Cities and ABC exceeded the new ownership limit of 12 stations and the 25% national reach limit, so the companies opted to sell WFTS; WXYZ-TV, the ABC-owned station in Detroit; and Cap Cities-owned ABC affiliates WKBW-TV in Buffalo and WTNH in New Haven, Connecticut; WFTS and WXYZ-TV were sold to Scripps.

Scripps continued the general-entertainment format on WFTS, running cartoons, sitcoms, movies and drama series. WFTS became the Tampa Bay market's Fox affiliate on August 8, 1988, after the network was dropped by WTOG.

As an ABC affiliate
On May 23, 1994, New World Communications signed an affiliation agreement with Fox that resulted in twelve of New World's stations, including Tampa Bay's longtime CBS affiliate WTVT (channel 13), being tapped to switch to the network. Among the stations making the switch were longtime CBS affiliates WJBK-TV in Detroit and WJW-TV in Cleveland. Not wanting to be relegated to the UHF band, CBS heavily wooed Detroit's longtime ABC affiliate, WXYZ, as well as Cleveland's longtime ABC affiliate, WEWS-TV. Both were owned by Scripps, who told ABC that it would switch WXYZ and WEWS to CBS unless ABC affiliated with three of its stations: WFTS, KNXV-TV in Phoenix (which was also slated to lose its Fox affiliation to New World-owned CBS affiliate KSAZ-TV), and WMAR-TV in Baltimore. Scripps insisted on including WFTS and KNXV in the deal, even though a news department was in construction at KNXV and no movement had yet occurred to build one in Tampa.

The ABC affiliation, confirmed on June 15, set off a mad dash. WFTS had already been planning a new studio facility in the vicinity of Tampa Stadium, and with the ABC tie-up confirmed, management scrambled to hire a news director. With the station's new facility not planned to be ready until late 1995, the news department initially operated from former facilities of the Home Shopping Network in Clearwater.

Another consequence of WFTS replacing WTSP (channel 10) in ABC's affiliate lineup was that it had a more centrally located transmitting facility, which then-ABC president Bob Iger cited as a positive in the switch. That meant that the network would no longer have had a coverage gap between Tampa and Fort Myers, which had been filled by WWSB (channel 40) in Sarasota since its 1971 sign-on. Coinciding with the Scripps-ABC pact, ABC notified WWSB that it would be terminating its affiliation; though no reason was given by the network, WWSB cited conversations with ABC officials who described it as essential to the broader deal when the Sarasota station petitioned to deny channel 28's license renewal. WWSB ended up winning its battle with ABC and signed a new affiliation contract in March 1995.

On December 12, 1994, WFTS became the market's ABC affiliate, WTSP switched to CBS and WTVT joined Fox; that same day, WFTS launched local news and broke ground on the Tampa studio. Most of WFTS' syndicated programs were then acquired by WTVT and WTTA, which also aired Fox Kids in the market.

WFTS was briefly the local over-the-air broadcast partner of the NHL's Tampa Bay Lightning, airing four Lightning games produced by the Sunshine Network during the 2002–03 season; by way of the NHL on ABC, WFTS broadcast the team's appearances in both the 2004 and 2022 Stanley Cup Finals. An East Coast traffic hub and the station group-wide graphics operation for Scripps were established at Tampa in 2009, as an open floor was available at the WFTS facility.

On September 24, 2020, a consortium made up of Scripps and Berkshire Hathaway announced the purchase of Ion Media, including local Ion Television station WXPX-TV (channel 66) and the company's technical operations center in Clearwater.

News operation
As an independent station, channel 28's local news staff consisted of just one staffer who produced and hosted news breaks.

Unlike the two Fox stations owned by Scripps that also became Big Three affiliates—KSHB-TV in Kansas City, Missouri, and KNXV-TV—no movement had occurred prior to the affiliation switch on establishing a local news service at WFTS-TV, though the station was considering establishing one. The primary reason was that the original channel 28 studios at I-4 and Columbus Drive were simply not large enough; the Himes Avenue facility project was only a plan when the switch was announced. In order to start producing news, WFTS needed to lease facilities, opting to set up shop in Clearwater. Bob Jordan of KCBS-TV in Los Angeles was hired to be the founding news director for 28 Tampa Bay News, which began broadcasting on December 12, 1994. Originally starting with 6 and 11 p.m. newscasts, a flurry of expansions took place during the first four months of 1995, including morning, 5 p.m., and 5:30 p.m.

The task of building the first new full-scale news service in Tampa Bay against decades-long competitors meant low ratings. WFTS typically rated in third or fourth place in most time slots in its first five years of local news. In 2001, Sam Stallworth and Bill Berra arrived from WSYX–WTTE in Columbus, Ohio, to serve as general manager and news director of WFTS-TV. The duo refocused the newsroom on hard news and investigative reporting, a prelude to the station rebranding as ABC Action News in October 2002 after a brief time as "28 News".

Ratings remained low, but the station made progress under general manager Richard Pegram, who arrived in 2009 and oversaw the launch of channel 28's first weekend morning newscast. In November 2012, WFTS overtook all other local stations in all evening and late news ratings in the demographic of adults 25–54; this marked the first time ever WFTS won at 5:00, 5:30, 6:00 and 11:00 p.m. in the key demographic during one ratings period. Pegram was dismissed in 2014, with one source noting he was a difficult boss and heavily involved in the news department.

In 2019, WFTS launched "ABC Action News Streaming Now", a digital news product that included daytime rolling news coverage, simulcasts of channel 28's existing newscasts, and a new 3 p.m. newscast to air on TV and online.

Notable former on-air staff 
 Jay Crawford – sports director (1998–2003)
 Scott Hanson – sports anchor (1994–2000; now at NFL Network)
 Walt Maciborski – anchor/reporter (2005–2009; now main anchor at KEYE-TV in Austin)
 Elaine Quijano – reporter (1998–2000; now with CBS News)
 Sage Steele – reporter (1998–2001; now at ESPN)

Technical information

Subchannels
The station's digital signal is multiplexed:

WFTS is also available in ATSC 3.0 (Next Gen TV) on the signal of WMOR-TV (channel 32). In exchange, WFTS hosts WMOR's main subchannel in the ATSC 1.0 format.

Analog-to-digital conversion
WFTS-TV shut down its analog signal, over UHF channel 28, on June 12, 2009, as part of the federally mandated transition from analog to digital television.

References

External links
ABCActionNews.com – Official website
"Behind the Scenes of 28 News", a 2002 documentary showing the WFTS-TV newsroom

FTS-TV
ABC network affiliates
Bounce TV affiliates
Grit (TV network) affiliates
Ion Mystery affiliates
E. W. Scripps Company television stations
Television channels and stations established in 1981
1981 establishments in Florida
National Hockey League over-the-air television broadcasters